Li Qianhua (born 6 June 2002) is a Chinese ice hockey player and member of the Chinese national ice hockey team,  playing in the Zhenskaya Hockey League (ZhHL) with the Shenzhen KRS.

Li represented China in the women's ice hockey tournament at the 2022 Winter Olympics in Beijing.

References

External links
 
 

2002 births
Living people
Chinese women's ice hockey defencemen
Ice hockey players at the 2022 Winter Olympics
Olympic ice hockey players of China
Shenzhen KRS Vanke Rays players